Elections to Lisburn Borough Council were held on 20 May 1981 on the same day as the other Northern Irish local government elections. The election used five district electoral areas to elect a total of 23 councillors.

Election results

Note: "Votes" are the first preference votes.

Districts summary

|- class="unsortable" align="centre"
!rowspan=2 align="left"|Ward
! % 
!Cllrs
! % 
!Cllrs
! % 
!Cllrs
! %
!Cllrs
! % 
!Cllrs
! %
!Cllrs
!rowspan=2|TotalCllrs
|- class="unsortable" align="center"
!colspan=2 bgcolor="" | DUP
!colspan=2 bgcolor="" | UUP
!colspan=2 bgcolor="" | Alliance
!colspan=2 bgcolor="" | SDLP
!colspan=2 bgcolor="" | UUUP
!colspan=2 bgcolor="white"| Others
|-
|align="left"|Area A
|30.2
|1
|bgcolor="40BFF5"|51.8
|bgcolor="40BFF5"|2
|0.0
|0
|18.0
|1
|0.0
|0
|0.0
|0
|4
|-
|align="left"|Area B
|bgcolor="#D46A4C"|43.7
|bgcolor="#D46A4C"|3
|39.7
|2
|10.6
|0
|0.0
|0
|0.0
|0
|6.0
|0
|5
|-
|align="left"|Area C
|bgcolor="#D46A4C"|54.3
|bgcolor="#D46A4C"|3
|20.6
|1
|11.9
|1
|0.0
|0
|5.9
|0
|7.3
|0
|5
|-
|align="left"|Area D
|bgcolor="#D46A4C"|49.6
|bgcolor="#D46A4C"|2
|27.3
|2
|18.5
|1
|0.0
|0
|1.8
|0
|2.8
|0
|5
|-
|align="left"|Area E
|bgcolor="#D46A4C"|30.0
|bgcolor="#D46A4C"|1
|28.7
|1
|15.3
|0
|15.9
|1
|1.6
|1
|8.5
|0
|4
|-
|- class="unsortable" class="sortbottom" style="background:#C9C9C9"
|align="left"| Total
|42.7
|10
|32.2
|8
|12.2
|2
|5.9
|2
|2.0
|1
|5.0
|0
|23
|-
|}

Districts results

Area A

1977: 2 x UUP, 1 x DUP, 1 x SDLP
1981: 2 x UUP, 1 x DUP, 1 x SDLP
1977-1981 Change: No change

Area B

1977: 2 x DUP, 2 x UUP, 1 x UUUP
1981: 3 x DUP, 2 x UUP
1977-1981 Change: DUP gain from UUUP

Area C

1977: 2 x UUP, 1 x DUP, 1 x Alliance, 1 x UUUP
1981: 3 x DUP, 1 x UUP, 1 x Alliance
1977-1981 Change: DUP (two seats) gain from UUP and UUUP

Area D

1977: 2 x UUP, 1 x DUP, 1 x Alliance, 1 x UPNI
1981: 2 x DUP, 2 x UUP, 1 x Alliance
1977-1981 Change: DUP gain from UPNI

Area E

1977: 1 x Alliance, 1 x UUP, 1 x DUP, 1 x SDLP
1981: 1 x DUP, 1 x UUP, 1 x SDLP, 1 x UUUP
1977-1981 Change: UUUP gain from Alliance

References

Lisburn City Council elections
Lisburn